The Minnesota State Open is the Minnesota state open golf tournament, open to both amateur and professional golfers. It is organized by the Minnesota section of the PGA of America. It was first played in 1917 and has been played at a variety of courses around the state.

History 
The first event was held on September 6, 1917. Twenty-four players played in the event. Professional golfer Tom Stevens, who played out of the Minikahda Club in Minneapolis, won the tournament by one stroke. 

In 1930, there was one of the more surprising victories. Edward Baening, a golf club salesman, "came out of nowhere" to win the event. During the mid-20th century, Joe Coria and Ade Simonson produced many highlights. In 1934, while still an amateur, Coria won for the first time. In 1940 he won for the second time, his first as a professional. In 1941, Coria and Simonson were the top contenders. Near the end of the tournament, Coria was the clubhouse leader though Simonson, still playing, was near the lead. On the 18th hole Simonson "plopped a shot 60 yards away out of a divot to within a foot of the cup" to assure a playoff with Coria. However, Coria defeated Simonson in the playoff. Coria won the tournament in 1952, his last victory. In 1959, Simonson had a chance to win. He had a four-shot lead going into the final round. However, Simonson made an 8 on the 10th hole of the final round which facilitated his loss to Bill Waryan. It was his seventh and final runner-up finish. Simonson never won the event. During this era, the tournament was held at a variety of courses around the state including Duluth, Mankato, Faribault, and Rochester.

In 1980, the event started to be permanently held at Bunker Hills Golf Club in Coon Rapids, Minnesota. During this year the tournament also started to be sponsored by National Car. It was sponsored by National Car until 1997. During these years, it was known as the National Car Open or, colloquially, as "the Car." From 1998 to 2001, the tournament was sponsored by Best Buy.

In 1998, the tournament was preceded by a series of events under the title "Minnesota Golf Week." The events included "a celebrity golf tournament, golf clinics, a junior, senior, and womens championship, entertainment and various fundraisers" followed by the tournament proper. 

Around the turn of the century, Australians with golf scholarships at the University of Minnesota have won the tournament. They include James McLean in 1998, Ben Meyers in 2001, and Yu Katayama in 2008.

Since 2009, the event has alternated between Bunker Hills and a different course in the state.

Winners

Source:

(a) denotes amateur

1 Playoff win

References

External links
PGA of America – Minnesota section

Golf in Minnesota
PGA of America sectional tournaments
State Open golf tournaments
Recurring sporting events established in 1917
1917 establishments in Minnesota